Loud is the lead single from American pop rock band R5's second EP of the same name. It was released on February 19, 2013, digitally and physically with the rest of the EP's tracks and was later included on the band's debut full-length album Louder (2013) as the lead single.

Reception
Loud has received generally positive reviews from both fans and critics. Musichel stated that all four songs of the album are "contagious tunes that are sure to hook their listeners." Matt Collar from Allmusic said, "with [its] mixture of dance and rock-oriented material, R5 find a nice balance between the sound of Maroon 5 and One Direction," and called the track very "infectious". ClevverTV talked about the music video, stating that "the vibe is just really upbeat". Fanlala stated that it is "one of the most fun music videos that [they had] ever seen".

Live performance
On July 7, 2013, "Loud" was performed for the first time in British TV show Blue Peter. On August 26, they performed in Canadian TV show The Morning Show.

Music video
The official music video was revealed on R5's website and Vevo channel on February 22, 2013. It depicts the band going around downtown LA, followed by a group of friends and having a good time. It also features the band performing the song on a rooftop, overlooking the city, as the sun goes down because as the song states, "Shout it out from the rooftops,". A few clips of the band having a blast — like BMX and skateboarding, partying, playing instruments, defying gravity, jumping on trampolines, falling in love — can be seen as well. The video was shot at downtown LA and was directed by Ryder Bayliss.

Awards and nominations

Charts

Release history

References

External links
 

R5 (band) songs
2013 singles
Hollywood Records singles
2013 songs
Songs written by Emanuel Kiriakou
Songs written by Lindy Robbins
Songs written by Andrew Goldstein (musician)
Songs written by E. Kidd Bogart